Apocalypse: Save Us is the second Korean studio album by South Korean girl group Dreamcatcher. It was released on April 12, 2022, by Dreamcatcher Company, and distributed by Sony Music. Apocalypse: Save Us features fourteen tracks including the lead single "Maison", as well as seven solo songs, and is available in "S", "A", "V", "E" versions and a jewel case version.

This album is the start of Dreamcatcher's new Apocalypse series after the conclusion of the previous series Dystopia. Commercially, the album sold over 136,239 copies. The group also collected their first music show win of their career with "Maison" on MBC M's Show Champion., The album also generally received favorable reviews by the critics.

Background and release 
On March 24, 2022, Dreamcatcher released the mystery code teaser for their upcoming April comeback. The group’s Mystery Code teasers signal the start of a new era as they gear up for a return. It was later revealed that Dreamcatcher will be making their return on April 12.

Official teasers for the album were first released on March 28, starting with a track list, followed by individual and group concept photos, a highlight medley, a dance preview, a story preview and a music video teaser. The album and the music video for the album were released on April 12, 2022. The group commemorated the release by hosting a special mini-concert in Korea, which was also available as an online stream for international fans. A world tour titled 2022 Dreamcatcher World Tour [Apocalypse: Save Us] associated with the album was announced on April 27, 2022, initially featuring eight shows in the United States. Two more dates for the tour (Mexico City and a second show in Los Angeles) were announced on June 14, 2022.

Composition 
The title track "Maison" is a song described as a "cry for help" to save the Earth from the apocalypse caused by global warming, environmental pollution, and human indifference. The title of the song was hidden through the morse code '321124433433' in the first album teaser. Maison is French for home, referencing the only known habitable planet; Earth. The other tracks include an intro titled "Intro: Save Us," "Locked Inside A Door," retro synth-pop "Starlight", deep house-based "Together," the ballad "Always," and the second instrumental track "Skit: The Seven Doors." The album holds more significance for the group's members as it includes a solo song produced by each of the members. Overall production was handled by composers Leez and Ollounder, who have collaborated before for Dreamcatcher's Nightmare and Dystopia worldviews.

Promotion

Apocalypse: Save Us World Tour 

On April 27, 2022, Dreamcatcher announced the 2022 Dreamcatcher World Tour [Apocalypse: Save Us], scheduled to take place from June 28 to July 2022. Ticket sales for Dreamcatcher’s new concert began on June 15 at 8:00 AM PST through Ticketmaster. The North American leg of their tour was originally set to conclude in Los Angeles, but the group has also since added a new show in Mexico City at the Auditorio BB on July 20.

Commercial performance 
As of May 2022, the album sold over 136,239 copies. It debuted on number 4 on Gaon Weekly Album Chart and went on to peak at number 8 on Gaon Monthly Album Chart with 126,654 sales for the month of April. According to Hanteo Charts, the album sold more than 85,000 copies first week since its release with 54,131 copies sold on the first day of release. Dreamcatcher had their debut peak on The Official Finnish Charts, reaching number 26. They also earned their first music show win of their career (1,924 days after their debut in 2017) with "Maison" on MBC M's Show Champion. On April 26, Dreamcatcher officially wrapped up their promotions with their goodbye stage performance on SBS MTV's The Show, where they earned their second music show win. The music video has amassed 22 million views as of June 2022.

Reception 
Tanu Raj for NME gave 3 out of 5 stars and wrote "while Dreamcatcher tackle climate change on their second studio offering, the effort does seem a tad misplaced in the face of the album's youthful optimism and that keeping a frantic pace throughout, "Maison" underlines an urgency that seems to be missing in many when it comes to climate change."

Track listing

Personnel 

 Leez – producing, lyrics, music, arrangement (12 tracks), MIDI programming, background vocals(track 2), synthesizer
 Ollunder – producing, lyrics, music, arrangement (12 tracks), MIDI programming, guitar
 Maddox – lyrics (track 2), music (track 5, 12)
 D.Van – lyrics (track 2)
 Buddy – lyrics (track 12), music, arrangement, bass, piano (tracks 2, 12)
 Kim Jun-hyeok – lyrics, music, arrangement (track 9, 13), bass, synthesizer
 Jeon Jae-hee – background vocals
 Sangyun – electric guitar
 Ji Yu-min – guitar
 Peperoni – music, arrangement, synthesizer (track 8)
 Oliv – lyrics, music, arrangement (track 9), MIDI programming
 Han Soo-seok – lyrics, music, arrangement (track 11, 14), piano, MIDI programming
 Lee Sang-beom – guitar (track 2)
 Shim Sang-yeop – choir
 Kim Soo-hee – piano
 Yeon Chang-jum – guitar
 SuA – lyrics, music, arrangement (track 9)
 Siyeon – lyrics, music, arrangement (track 10), background vocals (track 3)
 JiU – lyrics, music, arrangement (track 8)
 Handong – lyrics, music (track 11)
 Yoohyeon – lyrics, music, arrangement (track 12), background vocals (track 2)
 Dami – lyrics, music, arrangement (track 13)
 Gahyeon – lyrics, music (track 14)

Charts

Weekly charts

Monthly charts

Sales

Accolades

Release history

Notes

References 

Dreamcatcher (group) albums
Sony Music albums
2022 albums
Korean-language albums